Jennifer Eicher (born 10 October 1962) is a Swiss equestrian. She competed in the individual eventing at the 2004 Summer Olympics.

References

External links
 

1962 births
Living people
Swiss female equestrians
Olympic equestrians of Switzerland
Equestrians at the 2004 Summer Olympics
Sportspeople from Saint Paul, Minnesota